Erching (Lorraine Franconian: Erschinge) is a commune in the Moselle department of the Grand Est administrative region in north-eastern France.

The village belongs to the Pays de Bitche and to the Northern Vosges Regional Nature Park.

See also
 Communes of the Moselle department

References

External links
 

Communes of Moselle (department)